Willi Fricke (6 January 1913 - 15 June 1963) was a German footballer who played for SV Arminia Hannover and Eintracht Braunschweig. He was also capped once for the Germany national team, in a friendly against Luxembourg.

References

External links 
 

1913 births
1963 deaths
Footballers from Hanover
German footballers
Germany international footballers
Association football defenders
SV Arminia Hannover players
Eintracht Braunschweig players